Noqadi (also Romanized as Noqadī; also known as Naqadeh) is a village in Dodangeh Rural District, Hurand District, Ahar County, East Azerbaijan Province, Iran. At the 2006 census, its population was 92, in 22 families.

References 

Populated places in Ahar County